G0611 Zhangye-Wenchuan Expressway is a partially completed expressway in that connects Zhangye, Gansu and Wenchuan County, Sichuan in China.  It passes through Menyuan in Qinghai, Datong, Xining, Ping'an, Tongren, Henan, Erhai,  Zoigê, and Songpan.

On 30 April 2020, the section between Datong and Xianmi township opened.

On 27 December 2020, the section between Zhangye and Biandukou (Gansu-Qinghai border) opened.

References

Chinese national-level expressways
Expressways in Gansu
Expressways in Qinghai
Expressways in Sichuan